The MIT sailing team is a varsity intercollegiate athletic team of the Massachusetts Institute of Technology in Cambridge, Massachusetts, United States. The team is a member of the New England Intercollegiate Sailing Association, which is part of the Inter-Collegiate Sailing Association.

National championships 
MIT has won 14 national championships:
12 Dinghy National Championships (1937, 1938, 1939, 1943, 1945, 1946, 1951, 1954, 1955, 1958, 1961 and 2018)
2 Women’s Dinghy National Championships (1971 and 1973)

Sailors 
Alan Sun in 2000 and JM Modisette in 2005 won the Robert H. Hobbs Sportsmanship Award.

Horacio García in 1960; John Marvin in 1956; and Paula Lewin in 1992, 1996 and 2004, are olympic sailors from the MIT.

Fleet 
MIT developed their own dinghy in 1935, the Tech Dinghy, to be used by the team.

Venue 
The home venue of the team is the Walter C. Wood Sailing Pavilion, located on the Charles River. The building was completed in 1935.

References

External links
Website

Inter-Collegiate Sailing Association teams
MIT Engineers sailing